The 1944 All-Ireland Senior Football Championship Final was the 57th All-Ireland Final and the deciding match of the 1944 All-Ireland Senior Football Championship, an inter-county Gaelic football tournament for the top teams in Ireland.

Roscommon won their second and last title with late points by Frankie Kinlough and Donal Keenan; Kinlough also scored Roscommon's goal.

References

All-Ireland Senior Football Championship Final
All-Ireland Senior Football Championship Final, 1944
All-Ireland Senior Football Championship Finals
Kerry county football team matches
Roscommon county football team matches